Muhajbib, Mhaibib,   is a small village in the  Marjeyoun District in southern Lebanon.

Name
E. H. Palmer wrote that the name  Neby Muheibîb  meant "the prophet Muheibîb", "beloved".

History
In 1881, the PEF's Survey of Western Palestine (SWP)  described Neby Muheibib  as: "a small village round the stone Neby, containing about seventy Moslems, situated on top of ridge, with olives and arable land; there are two cisterns in the village."

References

Bibliography

External links 
Survey of Western Palestine, Map 4: IAA, Wikimedia commons

Populated places in Marjeyoun District